Harold Marion Jones (born April 9, 1936) is an American retired professional baseball player whose career lasted from 1956 to 1964.

Jones' professional career began in 1956 with the Negro league Kansas City Monarchs, whom he represented in that season's East–West All-Star Game.

Jones was born in Louisiana, Missouri.

Jones was a power hitter in minor league baseball, amassing seasons of 97, 99, 104, 104 and 127 runs batted in in levels ranging from Class D to Triple-A. He also had seasons of 22, 24, 27, 34 and 35 home runs and batted .284 lifetime. In the majors, 16 of his 17 games came during September call-ups. He collected 11 hits during those auditions, with two homers—solo blows hit September 19, 1961, against Bill Kunkel, and October 1, 1961, off Art Fowler.

References

External links

1936 births
Living people
African-American baseball players
Baseball players from Missouri
Batavia Indians players
Cleveland Indians players
Jacksonville Suns players
Kansas City Monarchs players
Keokuk Kernels players
Major League Baseball first basemen
Minot Mallards players
People from Louisiana, Missouri
Reading Indians players
Salt Lake City Bees players
Seminole Oilers players
Toronto Maple Leafs (International League) players
21st-century African-American people